James Haden Kerby (April 30, 1881 – September 11, 1957) was an early Arizona politician, elected 6 different times to the office of Secretary of State in the 1920s and 1930s. Kerby served the second longest tenure of that office, his 12 years being only beaten by Wesley Bolin's 28 years, 9 months, and 18 days.

Kerby left the office twice, in 1928 and 1938, to run for the Democratic nomination for governor, he failed in both attempts. Kerby also ran unsuccessfully as an Independent candidate for governor in 1938 after a narrow loss in the three-way primary, garnering less than 5% of the vote. He ran in the Democratic primary for the 1st congressional district in 1942 and in the Democratic primary for a seventh term as secretary of state in 1944, but failed in both endeavors.

He died in Phoenix, Arizona at the age of 76.

References

External links
 http://www.azsos.gov/about-office/secretaries-since-statehood/james-h-kerby
 http://www.ourcampaigns.com/CandidateDetail.html?CandidateID=201730

1881 births
1957 deaths
Secretaries of State of Arizona
Arizona Democrats
People from Huntsville, Missouri
20th-century American politicians